Maria Serena Encarnacion Icasiano Diokno, also known as Maris, is a Filipino historian, academic, and former government official best known for having served as chair of the National Historical Commission of the Philippines (NHCP) and as a high-ranking official of the University of the Philippines (UP) system. She graduated UP magna cum laude and earned a PhD in African and Oriental studies at the University of London in 1983. Diokno succeeded fellow historian Ambeth Ocampo as chairperson of the NHCP on April 7, 2011. She resigned from her position on November 29, 2016 in response to the burial of former president Ferdinand Marcos at the Libingan ng mga Bayani in Taguig, Metro Manila.

She is the daughter of Filipino nationalist figure and legislator Sen. Jose W. Diokno, who is the father of human rights. She is also the older sister of human rights advocate Atty. Chel Diokno and the aunt of Chel's son, the independent filmmaker Pepe Diokno. She aided her father at the Commission on Human Rights (CHR), where her father was the founder and first chairman, until the Mendiola Massacre caused Maris to resign for the first time in 1987. She later returned for her second government stint to join the NHCP.

Ancestry
She is the grand-child of Gen. Ananías Diokno, who was leader of the Visayan Forces in the Philippine–American War. Ananías is the father of Supreme Court Justice and senator Ramón Diokno. Ananías is also the great-great grandson of the namesake of Marikina, Gen. Felix Berenguer de Marquina y Fitzgerald. Because of the noble Irish roots of Berenguer de Marquina, Maris is descended from Norman French or English as well as European nobles such as the Belgian Saint Begga, who is her ancestor by forty seven degrees. Diokno is also a descendant of St. Begga's father-in-law St. Arnulf of Metz, France. St. Begga is the great-great grandmother of King Charlemagne. Diokno is also a descendant of William Boleyn, who is grandfather to Elizabeth I of England, and Diokno could trace her roots through the Fitzgerald clan all the way back to the first century A.D.

Professional career 
Maris has taught History, focusing on Asian and Southeast Asian history. She is currently a professor emeritus at UP Diliman. Her expertise in national history is primarily centered on the Philippine Revolution and on the Philippine-American War, of which her great-grandfather Ananías took part in as Governor of Capiz and the first general of the navy. Diokno has written close to a hundred publications that may be found in multiple libraries worldwide.

Gallery

Ancestral tree

See also
Diokno family
Chel Diokno
Jose Diokno
Ramón Diokno
Ananias Diokno
Francis Garchitorena
Pepe Diokno
NHCP
UP
University of London
CHR

References

Diokno family
20th-century Filipino historians
Filipino women historians
21st-century Filipino historians
Living people
1954 births
Filipino people of Indian descent